In mathematics, there are two different notions of a ring of sets, both referring to certain families of sets.

In order theory, a nonempty family of sets  is called a ring (of sets) if it is closed under union and intersection.
 implies  and
 implies 

In measure theory, a nonempty family of sets  is called a ring (of sets) if it is closed under union and relative complement (set-theoretic difference).
 implies  and
 implies 
This implies that a ring in the measure-theoretic sense always contains the empty set.

which shows that a family of sets closed under relative complement is also closed under intersection, so that a ring in the measure-theoretic sense is also a ring in the order-theoretic sense.

Examples

However, in general it will not be closed under differences of sets.

The open sets and closed sets of any topological space are closed under both unions and intersections.

If two rings of sets are both defined on the same elements, then the sets that belong to both rings themselves form a ring of sets.

Related structures

A ring of sets in the order-theoretic sense forms a distributive lattice in which the intersection and union operations correspond to the lattice's meet and join operations, respectively. Conversely, every distributive lattice is isomorphic to a ring of sets; in the case of finite distributive lattices, this is Birkhoff's representation theorem and the sets may be taken as the lower sets of a partially ordered set. 

A family of sets closed under union and relative complement is also closed under symmetric difference and intersection. Conversely, every family of sets closed under both symmetric difference and intersection is also closed under union and relative complement. This is due to the identities
 and

Symmetric difference and intersection together give a ring in the measure-theoretic sense the structure of a boolean ring.

Given a set  a  − also called an  − is a ring that contains  This definition entails that an algebra is closed under absolute complement  A σ-algebra is an algebra that is also closed under countable unions, or equivalently a σ-ring that contains  In fact, by de Morgan's laws, a δ-ring that contains  is necessarily a σ-algebra as well. Fields of sets, and especially σ-algebras, are central to the modern theory of probability and the definition of measures.

A  is a family of sets  with the properties
 If (3) holds, then  if and only if 
 implies  and
 implies  for some disjoint 
Every ring (in the measure theory sense) is a semi-ring.

 If  then there exists a finite number of mutually disjoint sets  such that 

This condition is stronger than (3), which can be seen as follows. Then:

and every  since it is closed under intersection, and disjoint since they are contained in the disjoint 's. Moreover the condition is strictly stronger: any  that is both a ring and a semialgebra is an algebra, hence any ring that is not an algebra is also not a semialgebra (e.g. the collection of finite sets on an infinite set ).

See also

References

External links

 Ring of sets at Encyclopedia of Mathematics

Families of sets
Measure theory